Courts of Louisiana include:
State courts of Louisiana

Louisiana Supreme Court
Louisiana Circuit Courts of Appeal (5 circuits)
Louisiana District Courts (42 districts)

;
Federal courts located in Louisiana

United States Court of Appeals for the Fifth Circuit (headquartered in New Orleans, Louisiana; having jurisdiction over the United States District Courts of Louisiana, Mississippi, and Texas)
United States District Court for the Eastern District of Louisiana
United States District Court for the Middle District of Louisiana
United States District Court for the Western District of Louisiana

Former federal courts of Louisiana
United States District Court for the District of Orleans (territorial court of the Territory of Orleans, extinct, abolished when Louisiana became a state on April 30, 1812)
United States District Court for the District of Louisiana (extinct, subdivided)
Mayors Courts
There are 250 towns and villages in Louisiana with a mayor/magistrate court system in Louisiana. 

Justice of the Peace Courts
There are approximately 390 justice of the peace courts in Louisiana with judicial authority of a ward or district elected to six year terms.

See also
 Judiciary of Louisiana

References

External links
National Center for State Courts – directory of state court websites.

Courts in the United States